The Lette railway line was a proposed railway running from Robinvale in Victoria to Lette in New South Wales, Australia. The line from Anneullo to Robinvale in Victoria was opened on 5 June 1924, and a  extension to Lette was planned, being provided for under the Border Railways Act 1922. The extension, part of a scheme to foster closer settlement of the Riverina district of New South Wales, was to serve the locations of Euston, Benanee, Koorakee, Werimble, Mylatchie and Lette.

Construction
Work started on the railway in 1926, and the rail-road bridge across the Murray River at Robinvale, built as part of the project, was opened on 14 March 1928. Construction was halted for a time, but recommenced in April 1929, and in April 1930, a special train ran as far as Koorakee. Construction work continued towards Lette, but was never completed, and the section to Koorakee was never officially opened for traffic.

Closure
Trains on the line were operated by the Railways Construction Branch until construction was officially abandoned on 12 February 1943.  The rail-road bridge was replaced in 2006 by a new road bridge. The lifting span of the former bridge has been placed in a nearby park, as a permanent historical display. The remains of the only other bridge on the line still exist today. The line to Robinvale is still open for freight trains, even though the section between Manangatang to Robinvale was closed in 2008.

See also
 Rail transport in Victoria
 Rail transport in New South Wales

References

Further reading
 
 

Railway lines in New South Wales
Closed regional railway lines in Victoria (Australia)